Tears of the Desert is an autobiographical book written by a Sudanese medical doctor who used the pen name Halima Bashir and co-authored by English journalist Damien Lewis. This autobiography gives an account of Bashir's life in the Darfur region of Sudan, marked by personal experience of civil war, genocide, sexual violence and murder. As a result of speaking out about the torture of her compatriots inflicted by Janjaweed militias, Bashir applied for political asylum in the United Kingdom.

Background
Halima Bashir grew up in a rural village Zaghawa in the Darfur region. Her father was wealthy enough to send her to a city school, where she excelled as a student. She went on to study medicine and became a doctor. Working in the emergency ward at the hospital in Hashma, Bashir treated patients from both sides of the war. Thus, she gained a reputation as a doctor all victims of the conflict could rely on for treatment, regardless of race. She was soon transferred by the government to Mazkhabad, a remote village in North Darfur. There, she treated 42 young school girls and their teachers who were brutally gang-raped in a government supported attack on the village. For speaking out about this attack to United Nations investigators, Bashir herself was brutally tortured and raped. When she returned to her home village, it had been destroyed by government helicopters and Janjaweed militia. Shortly after, Halima fled the country for fear of the government still hunting her.

Synopsis
When Halima attends secondary school in the city, she comes up against traditional enmities between the black Africans of Darfur and the minority Arab elite and their group's subsequent discrimination against the black Africans ever since. She further speaks about the lack of support from teachers in physical fights stemming from prejudices against schoolgirls, which leads to expulsion – all of it an early lesson in helplessness.

Aim of the novel
Co-author Damien Lewis stated that one of his goals was to, "make (…) you or I or anybody else in the West feel that that could be them (…) how would they feel, if that happened to them, brings it home to on the personal human family level. What would you feel, if it was your children or your father, or your grandparents, or your village? (…) So it doesn't feel like thousands of miles away in a different culture in a place we don't understand".

References

2008 non-fiction books
Autobiographies
Books about child abuse
Books about rape
Books about Sudan
Current affairs books
English-language books
HarperCollins books
Non-fiction books about genocide
Non-fiction books about war
Non-fiction books about racism
Wartime sexual violence
Collaborative autobiographies